The Wayfarers is an Australian folk band. Their album Home Among The Gum Trees - Songs For Aussie Kids was nominated for the ARIA Award for Best Children's Album in 1989.

Discography

Albums
The Barley Mow (1966) - Waymark
The Mighty Men of Mt. Isa (1973) 1. The Isa Rodeo 2. The Hitch-HikerAn Hour of Aussie Singalong Favourites (1987) - Music WorldHome Among The Gum Trees - Songs For Aussie Kids (1988) - Trans Tasman ProductionsThe First 200 Years (1988) - Trans Tasman ProductionsThe Great Aussie Barbie Party (1990) - Music WorldAve a Beer (1991) - Hughes Leisure GroupAnother Aussie Singalong Party (1992) - Hughes Leisure Group20 Aussie Animal Songs'' (1993) - Hughes Leisure Group

Awards and nominations

ARIA Music Awards

References

Australian folk music groups